= Isala punctata =

Scientific classification
- Kingdom: Animalia
- Phylum: Arthropoda
- Subphylum: Chelicerata
- Class: Arachnida
- Order: Araneae
- Infraorder: Araneomorphae
- Family: Thomisidae
- Genus: Isala; L. Koch, 1876
- Species: I. punctata

Binomial name
- Isala punctata L. Koch, 1876

Monotypic genus of spiders

Isala punctata is a species of South Pacific crab spiders. It is the only species in the monotypic genus Isala. It was first described by Ludwig Carl Christian Koch in 1876, and is found in Australia.

== See also ==
- List of Thomisidae species
